Tiefenthal is an Ortsgemeinde – a municipality belonging to a Verbandsgemeinde, a kind of collective municipality – in the Bad Dürkheim district in Rhineland-Palatinate, Germany.

Geography

Location 
The municipality lies in a small hollow with northern slopes between the Eisbach and Eckbach valleys in the Palatinate. Tiefenthal belongs to the Verbandsgemeinde of Leiningerland, whose seat is in Grünstadt. Until 1969, the municipality belonged to the now abolished district of Frankenthal.

History 
In 1318, the municipality had its first documentary mention as Dyfendal. 

The protestant church, built under the Dukes of Leiningen, still displays a beautiful pulpit scarved in oak and a three-spaced ceiling painting. It is known for the 3 first church bells after the second world war delivered to the protestantic Palatinate in 1949. They were made by the BVG in cast steel and ring with a very pleasant and harmonic sound.

Religion 
In 2007, 45.4% of the inhabitants were Evangelical and 35.4% Catholic. The rest belonged to other faiths or adhered to none.

Politics

Municipal council 
The council is made up of 12 council members, who were elected at the municipal election held on 7 June 2009, and the honorary mayor as chairman.

The municipal election held on 7 June 2009 yielded the following results:

Coat of arms 
The German blazon reads: In Rot ein goldenes Tatzenkreuz.

The municipality's arms might in English heraldic language be described thus: Gules a cross pattée humetty Or.

The arms were approved by the now defunct Regierungsbezirk administration in Neustadt and date from a 1724 seal. They are borrowed from the arms once borne by the Counts of Leiningen-Westerburg, to whom Tiefenthal belonged.

Economy and infrastructure

Transport 
A few kilometres away lies the Wattenheim interchange on the Autobahn A 6. Historically, a branch of the Eis Valley Railway once linked the municipality by a train station some 1,5 km away, with Grünstadt.

Famous people

Sons and daughters of the town 
 Wolfgang Wolf (born 1957), former football coach for 1. FC Kaiserslautern
 Arno Wolf (born 1959), former footballer with 1. FC Kaiserslautern

References 

Bad Dürkheim (district)